Cold Norton railway station served the village of Cold Norton, Essex. It was opened on 1 October 1889 by the Great Eastern Railway on a single-track branch line (Engineer's Line Reference WFM) from Woodham Ferrers to Maldon West. The station name was originally Cold Norton for Purleigh and Stow Maries this was later changed to Cold Norton for Latchingdon.

There was a fatal railway accident near Cold Norton in 1899.

The station was closed to passengers in September 1939 but the line remained in use for goods traffic until 1959.

References

External links
 Cold Norton station on navigable 1945 O. S. map
 GER Society webpage containing photograph of the station in 1911

Disused railway stations in Essex
Former Great Eastern Railway stations
Railway stations in Great Britain opened in 1889
Railway stations in Great Britain closed in 1939